The 2019 Malaysia Super League is the 16th season of the Malaysia Super League, the top-tier professional football league in Malaysia.

Johor Darul Ta'zim are the current defending champions from the 2018 Malaysia Super League seasons and will qualify for the group stage of 2019 AFC Champions League.

The first transfer window is from 29 November 2018 to 20 February 2019.

Club licensing regulations

Since the 2018 Malaysia Super League season, as part of the privatization effort, every team in the Liga Super Malaysia must have an FAM Club Licence to play in the league or be relegated. To obtain an FAM Club Licence, teams must be financially healthy and meet certain standards of conduct as organisations.

As in other national leagues, there are significant benefits to being in the top division:
A greater share of television broadcast licence revenues goes to Liga Super Malaysia sides.
Greater exposure through television and higher attendance levels helps Liga Super Malaysia teams attract the most lucrative sponsorship.
Liga Super Malaysia teams develop substantial financial muscle through the combination of television and gate revenues, sponsorship and marketing of their team brands. This allows them to attract and retain skilled players from domestic and international sources and to construct first-class stadium facilities.
Despite several reminders from FAM from the beginning of 2015, however there are few teams failed to get the approval for both AFC and FAM club licenses from First Instance Body (FIB) .

*Updated: 2 January 2019

Teams

Kelantan and Negeri Sembilan were relegated to 2019 Malaysia Premier League after finished 11th and bottom place of last season league. FELDA United and MISC-MIFA promoted to 2019 Malaysia Super League after securing place as champions and third-place in 2018 Malaysia Premier League.

Changes from last season

Team changes
Promoted from the 2018 Malaysia Premier League
 FELDA United
 Petaling Jaya City FC

Relegated to the 2019 Malaysia Premier League
 Kelantan
 Negeri Sembilan

Renamed/Rebranded Clubs

 MISC-MIFA was rebranded to Petaling Jaya City FC, and located to Petaling Jaya, Selangor.

Notes: 
   Originally FELCRA were promoted along with FELDA United to the 2019 Malaysia Super League, but after Felcra announced their withdrawal from the Super League participation, MISC-MIFA, the next highest team in the Premier League table, were invited as replacement.

Clubs locations

Venues

Personnel, kit and sponsoring

Coaching changes
Note: Flags indicate national team as has been defined under FIFA eligibility rules. Players may hold more than one non-FIFA nationality.

Foreign players
Southeast Asia (SEA) players need to have acquired at least 30 international caps for their senior national team with no period restriction on when caps are earned and those who has less than 30 international caps will be subjected to FMLLP approval.

Note: Flags indicate national team as defined under FIFA eligibility rules. Players may hold more than one FIFA and non-FIFA nationality.

 Players name in bold indicates the player is registered during the mid-season transfer window.
 Foreign players who left their clubs or were de-registered from playing squad due to medical issues or other matters.

Naturalisation players

Notes:
  Carrying Malaysian heritage.
  Participated in the Malaysia national team squad.

League table

Result table

Positions by round
The table lists the positions of teams after each week of matches.In order to preserve chronological evolvements, any postponed matches are not included to the round at which they were originally scheduled, but added to the full round they were played immediately afterwards.

Season statistics

Top scorers

Players sorted first by goals, then by last name.

Top assists
As of matches played 21 July 2019.

Clean sheets

Players sorted first by clean sheets, then by last name.

See also
 2019 Malaysia Premier League
 2019 Malaysia M3 League
 2019 Malaysia M4 League
 2019 Malaysia FA Cup
 2019 Malaysia Cup
 2019 Malaysia Challenge Cup
 2019 Piala Presiden
 2019 Piala Belia
 List of Malaysian football first transfers 2019

References

External links
 Football Association of Malaysia website
 Malaysian Football League website 

Malaysia Super League
Malaysia Super League seasons
1